Serdobsky District is an administrative and municipal district (raion), one of the twenty-seven in Penza Oblast, Russia. It is located in the southwest of the oblast. Its administrative center is the town of Serdobsk. Population: 54,520 (2010 Census);  The population of Serdobsk accounts for 64.9% of the district's total population.

References

Notes

Sources

Districts of Penza Oblast